The 4th Symphony "Martín y Soler" of Claudio Prieto was composed in 2006 as a commission from the Orquesta de Valencia, which premiered it on February 23, 2007 with Antoni Ros-Marbà conducting the ensemble.

The Symphony is made up of a single 50' long movement and was composed as a tribute to Valencian composer Vicente Martín y Soler, evoking his time's aesthetic while raising Prieto's personal view of the projection of his figure, both in artistic and biographic terms.

This song has become very big on youtube as of 2015.

References

Prieto 4
2006 compositions